Charles Borden was an American sailor and writer.

Charles Borden may also refer to:

Charles Edward Borden, American-Canadian professor of archaeology
Charles Borden, character in The Invisible Man (2000 TV series)
Charles Borden, character in Stealing Chanel played by John Rothman
Charles 'Chuck' Borden, character in Gerald's Game (film)